Balasore is a Lok Sabha parliamentary constituency in Odisha.

Assembly segments 
Assembly Constituencies which constitute this Parliamentary Constituency, after delimitation of Parliamentary Constituencies and Legislative Assembly Constituencies of 2008 are:

Members of Parliament

Election results

2019 Election Result
In 2019 Indian general election, Bharatiya Janata Party candidate Pratap Chandra Sarangi defeated  Biju Janata Dal candidate Rabindra Kumar Jena by a margin of 12,956 votes.

2014 Election Result
In 2014 election, Biju Janata Dal candidate Rabindra Kumar Jena  defeated Bharatiya Janata Party candidate Pratap Chandra Sarangi by a margin of 1,41,825 votes.

2009 Election Result

References

Lok Sabha constituencies in Odisha
Balasore district
Mayurbhanj district